Arasikere may refer to the following places:

 Arsikere, Hassan district, Karnataka, India
 Arsikeri, Harapanahalli taluk, Bellary district, Karnataka, India
 Arasikere, Tumkur, Karnataka, India